Zamorano may refer to:

People 
 África Zamorano (born 1998), Spanish swimmer
 Agustín V. Zamorano (1798–1842), Mexican Governor of Alta California
 Andrew Zamorano (born 1995), Uruguayan-Chilean footballer
 Armando Zamorano (born 1993), Mexican footballer
 Claudio Zamorano (born 1998), Chilean footballer
 Iván Zamorano (born 1967), Chilean footballer
 Jordan Zamorano (born 2001), Indonesian footballer
 Maitté Zamorano (born 1981), Bolivian footballer
 Pedro Zamorano (born 1971), French Paralympic athlete
 Rodrigo Zamorano (1542–1620), Spanish cosmographer
 Zamorano (Portuguese footballer) (born 1982)

Education 
 Zamorano, a private university in Francisco Morazán Department, Honduras
 Liceo Berta Zamorano Lizana, a high school in Coltauco, Cachapoal Province, Chile

Other uses 
 Chongos zamoranos, a Mexican dessert made of curdled milk
 Estero Zamorano, a river in Chile
 Zamorano cheese, a Spanish cheese made from sheep's milk
 Zamorano Club, American bibliophile club
 Zamorano-Leonés, a Spanish breed of large domestic donkey
 Zamorano Eighty, a list of rare books on the history of California, compiled by the Zamorano Club

See also 
 Zamora (disambiguation)